This is a list of international trips made by Willy Brandt, the 4th Chancellor of Germany, during his tenure from 21 October 1969 to 7 May 1974.

Summary of international trips

1969

1970

1971

1972

1973

1974

References

Willy Brandt
Brandt
Trips
Brandt